Hypsopygia albolinealis is a species of snout moth in the genus Hypsopygia. It was described by George Hampson in 1891. It is found in India.

References

Moths described in 1891
Pyralini